The Atkinson Dam is an earth-fill embankment dam across the Buaraba Creek and a naturally forming lagoon, which is located near Lowood in the South East region of Queensland, Australia. The main purpose of the dam is for irrigation of farming land in the lower Lockyer Valley. The resultant reservoir is called Lake Atkinson.

Location and features

The dam is connected to Seven Mile Lagoon via a  channel. Facilities at the dam include two boat ramps, picnic tables and two caravan parks. A maximum of 15 boats are permitted on the lake at any one time. In mid-2006 the dam was empty due to drought conditions in Australia.

Fishing
Fish stocking of silver perch, bass, southern saratoga and golden perch has resulted in an excellent fishery, although the dry periods, high evaporation rates and drawdowns for irrigation in summer, result in low water levels as well as oxygen depleted water which makes fishing much more difficult. Other fish that are present includes eel-tailed catfish and spangled perch.

See also

 List of dams in Queensland

References

External links

 Atkinson's Dam Fishing Information, Map, pictures & Water Level Gauge

Dams completed in 1970
Buildings and structures in Somerset Region
Dams in Queensland
Atkinson, Lake
Earth-filled dams
1970 establishments in Australia
Lockyer Valley Region